Omsk State Agrarian University (Omsk SAU, Russian: Омский государственный аграрный университет имени П.А. Столыпина) is a public agricultural higher education institution located in the city of Omsk (Russia). The university has a large territory (1133 hectares), and a green campus space located within the city. Omsk SAU consists of the main university located in Omsk, its branch in the city of Tara, and the University College of Agribusiness.

History 
The history of Omsk SAU dates back to February 24, 1918, when Omsk Agricultural Institute was founded. It became the first higher education institution in Omsk and the first agricultural one east of the Ural Mountains. The initial 1918 enrollment consisted of only 200 students studying at the agronomy department.

In 1919, it was planned to merge Omsk Agricultural Institute with recently created Omsk Polytechnic Institute. If it happened, the agricultural institution would transform into a faculty. Nevertheless, its independence was preserved. In 1922, it was renamed as Siberian Agricultural Academy, and in 1925 in became Siberian Institute of Agriculture and Forestry. In 1930, four associated institutes were organized on its basis, and three years later they were again merged into a single institution.

Omsk SAU changed its name and structure several times more, until in 2011 the current name was approved to honor the Prime Minister of the Russian Empire Pyotr Arkadyevich Stolypin. During the Great Patriotic War, university buildings housed the workshops of the plant number 357 "Progress" that was evacuated from sieged Leningrad. Educational process continued in the converted rooms. After the war, the university actively developed its infrastructure. Several dormitories and sports grounds were constructed, roads on the campus were asphalted, a canteen, a bathhouse, a student club were built, etc.

In 1971, the university was awarded the Order of Lenin.

In 1992, Advanced Training Institute was founded as part of Omsk SAU, and each year more than 2000 managers and agricultural specialists retrain there.

University structure 
The main university consists of 7 faculties:

 Agrotechnological Faculty.
 Faculty of Agrochemistry, Soil Sciences, Ecology, Environmental Engineering and Water Resources Exploitation
 Faculty of Veterinary Medicine.
 Faculty of Land Management.
 Faculty of Technical Service of Agroindustrial Complexes.
 Faculty of Zootechny, Commodity Science and Standardization.
 Faculty of Economics.

The Tara branch of Omsk SAU has the Faculty of Higher Education and the Faculty of Vocational Education.

Research activities 
Omsk SAU scholars have founded 28 scientific schools of thought that are still being developed by university faculty staff and students. The university has gained significant experience in selective breeding and genetics of field crops. Scientists at Omsk SAU Genetics and Breeding Center have created varieties of high-yielding wheat resistant to adverse conditions. Also, varieties of purple and blue wheat were developed. Other research priorities of the university include studies in the field of zootechny, developing eco-friendly technologies of producing grain, improving the means for prevention and treatment of domestic animals diseases, etc. In 2020, Omsk SAU won a government megagrant for the creation of a laboratory to increase the nutritional value of wheat. This project will be led by an invited foreign scientist.

University campus and infrastructure 
The main campus consists of closely located academic and administrative buildings and dormitories. Although the campus is located not far away from the city center and the main thoroughfare of the city, it is surrounded by a vast park and fields where students can practise.  In front of the main building there is a fountain "Crocodile and Frogs" built in 1937.  The fountain is one of the symbols of the university.

The main campus comprises:

 10 dormitories, including one for university staff, foreign guests, and postgraduate students;
 6 academic buildings;
 a student business incubator;
 laboratories;
 an arboretum;
 administrative and office buildings;
 Scientific Agricultural Library;
 2 grocery stores;
 a state-owned clinic;
 a laundry room;
 a kindergarten.

The second campus comprising the academic building of the Institute of Veterinary Medicine and Biotechnology and its two dormitories is located in the city center.

Shuttle transportation is not provided by the university. However, it cannot be considered as a serious disadvantage as the campus is relatively small and the public transport infrastructure is accessible.

Omsk SAU neighbors with four other Omsk universities, so that a student can easily commute between their campuses on feet or by bus. The infrastructure in the area where campuses are located includes 2 cinemas, cafes, a shopping mall and several grocery stores, and various banks.

International performance 
Up to 15% of 9000 Omsk SAU students are foreign citizens, coming primarily from Kazakhstan and other CIS countries. Omsk SAU technically can accept non-Russian speaking students, but it does not have study programs in other languages than Russian.

Since the International Relations Department was founded in 1995, Omsk State Agrarian University has participated in numerous scientific and educational international projects. Partnership network of Omsk SAU includes more than 100 institutions and organizations abroad. These are Grimme and Cargill companies, training centers DEULA-Nienburg and Logo e.V., Hartpury University and College, and University of Hohenheim.

Omsk SAU reputation and rankings 
Russian Ministry of Agriculture considers Omsk SAU a leading agrarian institution, placing it 7th among 54 participating HEIs. These universities are leaders in implementing educational programs and doing research that contribute to the technological renewal of agriculture.

The university holds 125th place in the ARES-2020 international rankings (category BB+), that proves good quality performance in teaching, research and reputation among employers.

According to Green Metric ranking, Omsk State Agrarian University takes the 5th place among agricultural universities in Russia, 31st place among 51 participants in Russia, and 641st place among 912 participants worldwide.

Student life 
There is a volunteer center "Globus", an eco-activist organization "The Earth - our common home", and a number of dancing, theater and music groups. Typical events students can participate in are visits to veterans’ houses, charity and patriotic events, help to handicapped people, visits to local schools to present the university to pupils, and sports competitions. Omsk SAU encourages students to actively participate in such events by offering higher scholarships for activists.

Curricula 
Academic year at Omsk State Agrarian University starts on 1 September and lasts till the beginning of July. It is divided into 2 semesters, with the winter exams starting in the middle of January and summer exams held in June–July. Before passing the exams, students have to pass so-called «zachety» (Russian: зачёты) which are typically pass-fail type small exams without grades.

Students are expected to pass internships to practise theoretical skills they gain at the university. Typically, these internships are organized in the end of summer or in fall. They are held on partner enterprises of Omsk SAU.

There are also certain detailed rules and requirements that are used in each of the study programs. They can be checked with Dean's offices representatives or found on the website.

Tuition fees and scholarships 
Omsk SAU can accept foreigners to study for free if they meet requirements set by the Russian government. In this case, a student is also paid a monthly scholarship amounting to 3000 rubles per month ($40).

If a foreign citizens decides to study on commercial basis, he is obliged to pay annual tuition fee of approximately 137 000 rubles (Bachelor's studies), 145 000 rubles (Master's studies) or 155 000 rubles (postgraduate studies).

Notable scholars and teachers 
Pyotr Ludovikovich Dravert — a Russian and Soviet scientist, geologist, mineralogist, historian and writer.

Alexandr Dmitrievich Kizyurin — a well-known horticulturist and Doctor of Agricultural Sciences, researcher in the field of creeping varieties of fruit trees.

Fyodor Mikhailovich Kokhomskiy — Doctor of Agricultural Sciences, Hero of Socialist Labor, head of the project for creating a highly productive herd of cattle.

Alexey Mikhailovich Sitnikov — Doctor of Agricultural Sciences, Hero of Socialist Labor, who wrote of more than 120 papers on tillage and farming.

References

External links
 Official website, (in Russian)
 Official website, (in English)

 
Agricultural universities and colleges in Russia
1918 establishments in Russia
Educational institutions established in 1918
Universities in Omsk Oblast
Omsk